Vijai Pal Singh (23 February 1923 – 6 May 1996) was an Indian politician and Member of Parliament from village Biral  of Tehsil Budhana district Muzaffarnagar. Singh was a member of Communist Party of India, while in office in 1971.

Singh died in Muzaffarnagar on 6 May 1996, at the age of 73.

References

1923 births
1996 deaths
Communist Party of India politicians from Uttar Pradesh
India MPs 1971–1977
Lok Sabha members from Uttar Pradesh
Uttar Pradesh MLAs 1962–1967